Dawlat Zadran (born 19 March 1988) is an Afghan cricketer. Zadran is a right-handed batsman who bowls right-arm fast. He was born in Paktia Province.

Career 
Zadran made his List A debut for Afghanistan when they became the first side to tour Pakistan since the 2009 attack on the Sri Lanka national cricket team, with Afghanistan playing 3 unofficial One Day Internationals against Pakistan A.  Zadran took 6 wickets in the series, which came at an average of 28.83, with best figures of 3/45.  He later made his first-class debut for Afghanistan against Canada in the 2011-13 ICC Intercontinental Cup and followed this up by making his One Day International (ODI) debut against the same opposition in the 2011–13 ICC Intercontinental Cup One-Day.  He played both of Afghanistan's ODIs against Canada, taking 4 wickets in the series.

In April 2019, he was named in Afghanistan's squad for the 2019 Cricket World Cup.

In September 2021, he was named in Afghanistan's squad for the 2021 ICC Men's T20 World Cup.

References

External links

1988 births
Living people
People from Khost Province
Afghan cricketers
Afghanistan One Day International cricketers
Afghanistan Twenty20 International cricketers
Cricketers at the 2015 Cricket World Cup
Cricketers at the 2019 Cricket World Cup